Saarbrücken is an electoral constituency (German: Wahlkreis) represented in the Bundestag. It elects one member via first-past-the-post voting. Under the current constituency numbering system, it is designated as constituency 296. It is located in southern Saarland, comprising most of the district of Regionalverbrand Saarbrücken district.

Saarbrücken was created for the inaugural 1957 federal election after the accession of Saarland to Germany. Since 2017, it has been represented by Josephine Ortleb of the Social Democratic Party (SPD).

Geography
Saarbrücken is located in southern Saarland. As of the 2021 federal election, it comprises the municipalities of Großrosseln, Kleinblittersdorf, Püttlingen, Riegelsberg, Saarbrücken, and Völklingen from the Regionalverbrand Saarbrücken district.

History
Saarbrücken was created in 1957, then known as Saarbrücken-Stadt. In the 1976 through 1998 elections, it was named Saarbrücken I. It acquired its current name in the 2002 election. In the 1957 and 1961 elections, it was constituency 243 in the numbering system. In the 1965 through 1998 elections, it was number 244. Since the 2002 election, it has been number 296.

Originally, the constituency comprised the independent city of Saarbrücken as well as the municipalities of Dudweiler and the Ämter of Brebach, Kleinblittersdorf, and Riegelsberg from the Landkreis Saarbrücken district. In the 1976 through 1998 elections, it comprised the municipalities of Saarbrücken and Kleinblittersdorf from the Saarbrücken district. It acquired its current borders in the 2002 election.

Members
The constituency has been held by the Social Democratic Party (SPD) during all but four Bundestag terms since its creation. It was first represented by Heinrich Schneider of the Free Democratic Party (FDP) from 1957 to 1961, followed by Eugen Huthmacher of the Christian Democratic Union (CDU) from 1961 to 1965. Rudolf Hussong of the SPD won it in 1965 and served one term before being succeeded by Günter Slotta from 1969 to 1976. Hajo Hoffmann was representative from 1976 to 1987, followed by Margit Conrad from 1987 to 1990. Oskar Lafontaine was elected in 1990, but did not accept his mandate at that time; he was re-elected in 1994 and 1998. Elke Ferner was representative from 2002 to 2009, when the constituency was won by Anette Hübinger of the CDU. She was re-elected in 2013. Josephine Ortleb regained the constituency for the SPD in 2017.

Election results

2021 election

2017 election

2013 election

2009 election

References

1957 establishments in West Germany
Constituencies established in 1957
Saarbrücken (district)
Federal electoral districts in Saarland